Fort Sumner was built during the American Civil War by the Union Army in the Brookmont section of Bethesda, Maryland, just northwest of Washington, D.C.

Construction

The earthwork fort was an 1863 expansion of Fort Alexander, Fort Ripley, and Fort Franklin, which were built to protect the Washington Aqueduct, the new water supply for the city, and the adjacent Potomac River shoreline. Fort Sumner was named for Major General Edwin Vose Sumner, who died in 1863 from fever he contracted while at his daughter's house.

The fort had a commanding view above the Potomac River and included 30 artillery pieces. 
In addition to the aforementioned components, the site included Battery Bailey and Battery Benson, overlooking Little Falls Branch.

Remains
Fort Sumner was razed in 1953. There are a few visible remains of Battery Bailey in Westmoreland Hills Park, which can be seen from the adjacent Capital Crescent Trail. Part of the site was acquired by the Army Map Service (AMS) early in World War II and renamed Fort Sumner. The AMS was renamed US Army Topographic Command in 1968 and merged into the Defense Mapping Agency in 1972, at which time the site was renamed Defense Mapping Agency Topographic Center. The Defense Mapping Agency and its successors, the National Imagery and Mapping Agency and the National Geospatial-Intelligence Agency, occupied the site until the early 2010s. The residential area that was built over Fort Sumner has a plaque about the fort at Sangamore Road and West Path Way, and portions of it are named "Fort Sumner Hills" and "Sumner Village".

Gallery

See also
Civil War Defenses of Washington

References

Buildings and structures in Bethesda, Maryland
Sumner
Sumner
Buildings and structures demolished in 1953
Demolished buildings and structures in Maryland
1861 establishments in Maryland